Crows Fork Creek is a stream in Callaway County in the U.S. state of Missouri. Crows Fork is a tributary to Auxvasse Creek.

Crows Fork Creek was named after Jonathan Crow, a pioneer citizen.

See also
List of rivers of Missouri

References

Rivers of Callaway County, Missouri
Rivers of Missouri